Renberg is a Nordic surname. Notable people with the surname include:

Elsa Laula Renberg (1877–1931), Sami activist and politician
Mikael Renberg (born 1972), Swedish ice hockey player
Tore Renberg (born 1972), Norwegian writer

See also
Rehberg (surname)

Surnames of Scandinavian origin